Mountainous Landscape with a Bridge and Four Horsemen is an oil painting on panel by the Flemish painter Joos de Momper. Its date of execution is unknown. The painting was once attributed to Paul Bril. It is part of the permanent collection of the Louvre in Paris.

Painting
The painting depicts a frequent theme in 16th- and 17th-century Flemish painting, explored by Cornelis van Dalem, Pieter Bruegel the Elder, and Lucas van Valckenborch.

The work was acquired by the French state from the monarchy. It was part of the collection of Louis XIV, who acquired it from Eberhard Jabach in 1671. The painting was attributed to Paul Bril in 1824, but is now considered to be the work of de Momper.

References

External links
Painting at the Louvre official website
Painting at the Ministère de la Culture
Painting at the Web Gallery of Art

16th-century paintings
17th-century paintings
Landscape paintings
Paintings by Joos de Momper
Paintings in the Louvre by Dutch, Flemish and German artists